Bremen-Walle Telecommunication Tower (official designation of Bremen TV tower), which is not accessible for the public, is, like the telecommunication tower at Münster and the Friedrich-Clemens-Gerke Tower in Cuxhaven, a reproduction of the telecommunication tower Kiel.  It is 235.70 meters high. The diameter of the operating pulpit, which is 108.20 meters above ground, is 40 meters. The telecommunication tower is located in the Bremen quarter Walle at the Utbremer road, about 2.5 kilometers northwest from the city center (market place with city hall, pc. Petri cathedral, Roland and the city musicians of Bremen). All FM-radio and TV programs of radio Bremen in Bremen are transmitted today from this tower. A 70 cm amateur radio relay, DB0OZ, with an expenditure frequency of 438.825 MHz, is also on the tower.

In 2000, installing a restaurant in the operating pulpit was considered, but these plans were once again rejected.

Transmitted programmes

FM

TV

See also
 List of amateur radio repeater sites in Germany
 List of towers

References

External links
 http://skyscraperpage.com/diagrams/?b1971
 

Communication towers in Germany
1986 establishments in West Germany
Buildings and structures in Bremen (city)
Towers completed in 1986